Siphocodon is a genus of plants in the family Campanulaceae. It contains two known species, both endemic to Cape Province of South Africa.

 Siphocodon debilis Schltr. 1897
 Siphocodon spartioides Turcz. 1852

References

Campanuloideae
Campanulaceae genera
Flora of South Africa
Taxa named by Nikolai Turczaninow